Ashley Heather Foy (born January 7, 1990) is an American former competitive ice dancer. Competing for Germany with Benjamin Blum, she placed 13th at the 2008 World Junior Championships.

Career 
Early in her career, Foy competed with Dean Copely.

Foy moved to Dortmund, Germany in July 2005 to train with partner Benjamin Blum. She was a member of the German national team 2006-2009. Representing TSC Eintracht Dortmund together with Blum, she was the 2008 German national champion in junior ice dancing and finished 13th overall at the 2008 World Junior Championships. Foy and Blum stopped competing in 2008.

Foy is currently coaching in Simsbury & Cromwell, Connecticut. She is the Director of Figure Skating at Norwich Arena. She has been a member of the Yale FSC in New Haven, Connecticut, since 2008 and remains a member of the TSC Eintracht in Dortmund, Germany.

Personal life 
Foy graduated magna cum laude as the 2011 Modern Language Department Honoree at Central Connecticut State University in New Britain, Connecticut, in May 2011 with a BA in German language and literature and minors in European Union/West European studies and psychology. Foy currently attends Tufts University in Boston, Massachusetts, where she is pursuing a master's degree. She got married on August 10, 2013, in Boston, Massachusetts.

Competition history
Representing Germany with Benjamin Blum:

 Bavarian Open (Oberstdorf - German Team Junior World Qualifier) 2008: 1st
 Berlin Open Championships 2006 Junior: 1st

References

External links 
 
 Ashley Foy / Benjamin Blum at Tracings.net
 Ashley Foy / Jarmuth at Tracings.net

1990 births
Living people
Sportspeople from Hartford, Connecticut
American female ice dancers
21st-century American women